In the mathematical field of graph theory, Hall-type theorems for hypergraphs are several generalizations of Hall's marriage theorem from graphs to hypergraphs. Such theorems were proved by Ofra Kessler, Ron Aharoni, Penny Haxell, Roy Meshulam, and others.

Preliminaries 
Generalizing Hall's theorem to hypergraphs requires a generalization of the concepts of bipartiteness, perfect matching, and neighbors.

1. Bipartiteness: The notion of a bipartiteness can be extended to hypergraphs in many ways (see bipartite hypergraph). Here we define a hypergraph as bipartite if it is exactly 2-colorable, i.e., its vertices can be 2-colored such that each hyperedge contains exactly one yellow vertex.

2. A matching is called -perfect (or -saturating) if its size is exactly . This definition reduces to the standard definition of a -perfect matching in a bipartite graph.

3. Formally: 

  

Insufficiency of Hall's condition 
With hypergraphs this condition is insufficient. For example, consider the tripartite hypergraph with edges:{ {1, a, A}, {2, a, B} }Let  Every vertex in  has a neighbor, and  itself has two neighbors:  But there is no -perfect matching since both edges overlap.

One could try to fix it by requiring that  contain at least  disjoint edges, rather than just  edges. In other words:  should contain a matching of size at least . However, this fix is insufficient, as shown by the following tripartite hypergraph:{ {1, a, A}, {1, b, B}, {2, a, B}, {2, b, A} }Let  Again every vertex in  has a neighbor, and  itself has four neighbors:  Moreover,  since  admits a matching of size 2, e.g. However, H does not admit a -perfect matching, since every hyperedge that contains 1 overlaps every hyperedge that contains 2.

Thus, to guarantee a perfect matching, a stronger condition is needed. Various such conditions have been suggested.

Aharoni's conditions:  largest matching 

Let  be a bipartite hypergraph (as defined in 1. above), in which the size of every hyperedge is exactly , for some integer .

Then  admits a -perfect matching  (as defined in 2. above).

This was first conjectured by Aharoni. It was later proved for all -uniform hypergraphs.

In simple graphs 
For a bipartite simple graph , and Aharoni's condition becomes:

Since singletons do not intersect, the entire set of singletons is a matching. Thus, Aharoni's condition becomes, for every subset  of :

This is exactly Hall's marriage condition.

Tightness 
The following example shows that the factor  cannot be improved. Choose some integer .  Let  be the following -uniform bipartite hypergraph:

 
 For each  in   contains  disjoint hyperedges of size :

  contains  hyperedges of size :

However, every subset  of  satisfies the following inequality

since  contains at least  hyperedges, and they are all disjoint.

Fractional matchings 
Clearly .

It was conjectured that in this case, too,  admits a -perfect matching.

Later it was proved that, if the above condition holds, then  admits a -perfect fractional matching, i.e.,  .

Haxell's condition: smallest transversal 

Let  be a bipartite hypergraph in which the size of every hyperedge is at most , for some integer .

In words: the neighborhood-hypergraph of  has no transversal of size  or less.

Then,  admits a -perfect matching (as defined in 2. above).

In simple graphs 
For a bipartite simple graph  so , and Haxell's condition becomes:

In a hypergraph of singletons, a transversal must contain all vertices. Thus, Haxell's condition becomes, for every subset  of :

This is exactly Hall's marriage condition. Thus, Haxell's theorem implies Hall's marriage theorem for bipartite simple graphs.

Tightness 
The following example shows that the factor  cannot be improved. Let  be an -uniform bipartite hypergraph with:

 
 

[so ].

 

where:

[so  contains  hyperedges].

 

for 

[so  contains  hyperedges].

This  does not admit a -perfect matching, since every hyperedge that contains 0 intersects every hyperedge that contains 1.

However, every subset  of  satisfies the following inequality:

It is only slightly weaker (by 1) than required by Haxell's theorem. To verify this, it is sufficient to check the subset , since it is the only subset for which the right-hand side is larger than 0.

for 

To cover the hyperedges of  we need  vertices - one vertex in each row. Now, since  contains all columns, we need at least  additional vertices - one vertex for each column  All in all, each transversal requires at least  vertices.

Algorithms 
Haxell's proof is not constructive. However, Chidambaram Annamalai proved that a perfect matching can be found efficiently under a slightly stronger condition.

In fact, in any -uniform hypergraph, the algorithm finds either a -perfect matching, or a subset  violating the above inequality.

Similar algorithms have been applied for solving problems of fair item allocation, in particular the santa-claus problem.

Aharoni–Haxell conditions: smallest pinning sets 
The width of a hypergraph , denoted , is the smallest size of a subset of  that pins .

Aharoni and Haxell proved the following condition:Let  be a bipartite hypergraph. Then,  admits a -perfect matching.They later extended this condition in several ways, which were later extended by Meshulam as follows:Let  be a bipartite hypergraph.

 Then,  admits a -perfect matching.

In simple graphs 

Thus, both the above conditions are equivalent to Hall's marriage condition.

Examples 
It remains to check the subset  itself.

Indeed, H admits a -perfect matching, e.g. 
 Here  Its matching-width is 1: it contains a matching of size 2, e.g.   but this matching can be pinned by a single edge, e.g. Hence, the Aharoni–Haxell sufficient condition is not satisfied. Indeed,  does not admit a -perfect matching.
  Here, as in the previous example,  so the Aharoni–Haxell sufficient condition is violated. However, this  does admit a -perfect matching, e.g.  which shows that these conditions are not necessary.

Set-family formulation 

In this terminology, the Aharoni–Haxell theorem can be stated as follows.

Let  be a collection of families of sets. Then  admits a system of disjoint representatives.

Necessary and sufficient condition 
Let  be a bipartite hypergraph. The following are equivalent:

  admits a -perfect matching.

In set-family formulation: let  be a collection of families of sets. The following are equivalent:

  admits a system of disjoint representatives;

Examples 
Consider example #3 above:     Since it admits a -perfect matching, it must satisfy the necessary condition. Indeed, consider the following assignment to subsets of :

 
 
 

In the sufficient condition pinning  required at least two edges from  it did not hold.

But in the necessary condition, pinning  required at least two edges from  it does hold.

Hence, the necessary+sufficient condition is satisfied.

Proof 
The proof is topological and uses Sperner's lemma. Interestingly, it implies a new topological proof for the original Hall theorem.

Let  They consider an -vertex simplex, and prove that it admits a triangulation  with some special properties that they call economically-hierarchic triangulation.

Their sufficient condition implies that such a labeling exists.

Conditions (a) and (b) guarantee that this coloring satisfies Sperner's boundary condition. Therefore, a fully-labeled simplex exists. This is the desired -perfect matching.

Extensions 
The Aharoni–Haxell theorem has a deficiency version.

Meshulam's conditions - the topological Hall theorems

In abstract simplicial complexes 
Let  be a set of vertices.

Then there exists a transversal. That is: there is a set in   that intersects each  by exactly one element.  This theorem has a deficiency version. If, for every subset  of :

then there exists a partial -transversal, that intersects some  sets by 1 element, and the rest by at most 1 element. More generally, if  is a function on positive integers satisfying , and for every subset  of : 

Meshulam's game 
Using the above theorem requires some lower bounds on homological connectivity. One such lower bound is given by Meshulam's game. This is a game played by two players on a graph. One player - CON - wants to prove that the graph has a high homological connectivity. The other player - NON - wants to prove otherwise. CON offers edges to NON one by one; NON can either disconnect an edge, or explode it; an explosion deletes the edge endpoints and all their neighbors. CON's score is the number of explosions when all vertices are gone, or infinity if some isolated vertices remain.

Therefore, the above theorem implies the following. Let  be a set of vertices. Suppose that, for every subset  of :

In simple bipartite graphs 
Then, the independence complex  is equal to the matching complex of H, denoted . So there are  disjoint cliques. Thus, Meshulam's condition 

is equivalent to Hall's marriage condition. Here, the sets  are pairwise-disjoint, so a  -transversal contains a unique element from each , which is equivalent to a -saturating matching.

In matching complexes 
Let  be a bipartite hypergraph, and suppose    is its matching complex .

If, for every subset  of :

Then there exists a matching that intersects each set  exactly once (it is also called a rainbow matching, since each  can be treated as a color).

The matching complex of a hypergraph is exactly the independence complex of its line graph, denoted . Therefore, the above theorem implies: 

Combining the previous inequalities leads to the following condition. 
Let  be a bipartite hypergraph.

where  is considered a multi-hypergraph (i.e., it may contain the same hyperedge several times, if it is a neighbor of several different elements of ). Then,  admits a -perfect matching.

Examples 
It remains to check the subset  itself.
s 
 Here  The graph  has three vertices:  Only the last two are connected; the vertex Aa is isolated. Hence, . Indeed,  admits a -perfect matching, e.g. 
H = { {1,A,a}; {1,B,b}; {2,A,b}, {2,B,a} }. Here  has four vertices:  and four edges:  For any edge that CON offers, NON can explode it and destroy all vertices. Hence, . Indeed,  does not admit a -perfect matching.
    Here  is the same as in the previous example, so Meshulam's sufficient condition is violated. However, this  does admit a -perfect matching, e.g.  which shows that this condition is not necessary.
No necessary-and-sufficient condition using  is known.

More conditions from rainbow matchings 
A rainbow matching is a matching in a simple graph, in which each edge has a different "color". By treating the colors as vertices in the set , one can see that a rainbow matching is in fact a matching in a bipartite hypergraph. Thus, several sufficient conditions for the existence of a large rainbow matching can be translated to conditions for the existence of a large matching in a hypergraph.

The following results pertain to tripartite hypergraphs in which each of the 3 parts contains exactly  vertices,  the degree of each vertex is exactly , and the set of neighbors of every vertex is a matching (henceforth "-tripartite-hypergraph"):

 Every -tripartite-hypergraph has a matching of size .
 Every -tripartite-hypergraph has a matching of size .
 Every -tripartite-hypergraph has a matching of size .
H. J. Ryser conjectured that, when  is odd, every -tripartite-hypergraph has a matching of size .
 S. K. Stein and Brualdi conjectured that, when  is even, every -tripartite-hypergraph has a matching of size . (it is known that a matching of size  might not exist in this case).
The following results pertain to more general bipartite hypergraphs:

The  is the best possible: if , then the maximum matching may be of size -1.
It is not known whether this is the best possible. For even , it is only known that  is required; for odd , it is only known that  is required.

See also 
 Rainbow independent set

Conforti-Cornuejols-Kapoor-Vuskovic condition: Balanced hypergraphs 

Let  be a balanced hypergraph. The following are equivalent:
 admits a perfect matching (i.e., a matching in which each vertex is matched).

In simple graphs 
A simple graph is bipartite iff it is balanced (it contains no odd cycles and no edges with three vertices).

Let  for all edges  in " means that  contains all the neighbors of vertices of   Hence, the CCKV condition becomes:"If a subset  of  contains the set , then ".This is equivalent to Hall's condition.

See also 

 Perfect matching in high-degree hypergraphs - presents other sufficient conditions for the existence of perfect matchings, which are based only on the degree of vertices.

References 

Hypergraphs
Matching (graph theory)
Theorems in graph theory
Graph algorithms